Marmorofusus polygonoides is a species of sea snail, a marine gastropod mollusc in the family Fasciolariidae, the spindle snails, the tulip snails and their allies.

Description

Distribution
This marine species occurs in the southern Gulf of Suez, Gulf of Aqaba, and north-central Red Sea

References

External links
 Lamarck, [J.-B. M.] de. (1822). Histoire naturelle des animaux sans vertèbres. Tome septième. Paris: published by the Author, 711 pp
 Deshayes G.P. (1833). [Coquilles de la Mer Rouge] in L. de Laborde, Voyage de l'Arabie Pétrée par Léon de Laborde et Linant. Giard, Paris. 87 pp, 69 pl., 2 map
 Lyons W.G. & Snyder M.A. (2019). Reassignments to the genus Marmorofusus Snyder & Lyons, 2014 (Neogastropoda: Fasciolariidae: Fusininae) of species from the Red Sea, Indian Ocean, and southwestern Australia. Zootaxa. 4714(1): 1-64

polygonoides
Gastropods described in 1822